Jerome Francis Donovan (February 1, 1872 – November 2, 1949) was an American lawyer and politician who served two terms as a United States representative from New York from 1918 to 1921.

Early life
Jerome F. Donovan was born in New Haven, Connecticut on February 1, 1872. He attended the public schools, graduated from Yale Law School in 1894, was admitted to the bar and commenced practice in New Haven.

Military career 
Donovan joined the Connecticut Army National Guard for the Spanish–American War, and served as captain of Company C, 2nd Regiment from 1897 to 1903. Afterwards he was active in the United Spanish War Veterans.

Political career 
A Democrat, Donovan was a member of the Connecticut House of Representatives from 1901 to 1903, and New Haven City Auditor from 1902 to 1904. From 1904 to 1906 he was Secretary of the New Haven Civil Service Commission.

Donovan moved to New York City in 1910 and continued to practice law. From 1911 to 1913 he served as a state Special Deputy Attorney General.  In 1918 he was elected to the 65th Congress in a special election to fill the vacancy caused by the resignation of George Murray Hulbert. Later in 1918 he was elected to a full term in the 66th Congress, and he served in the House from March 5, 1918, to March 4, 1921. He was an unsuccessful candidate for reelection in 1920.

From 1923 to 1924 Donovan served as Deputy Attorney General for the New York State Department of Labor. He then resumed the practice of law in New York City until retiring in 1936.

Death 
In retirement Donovan resided in Stony Creek, Connecticut, where he died on November 2, 1949, and was buried at St. Bernard's Cemetery in New Haven.

References

External links

1872 births
1949 deaths
Politicians from New Haven, Connecticut
Yale Law School alumni
Connecticut lawyers
New York (state) lawyers
National Guard (United States) officers
American military personnel of the Spanish–American War
Democratic Party members of the Connecticut House of Representatives
Burials in Connecticut
Democratic Party members of the United States House of Representatives from New York (state)
Connecticut National Guard personnel
Lawyers from New Haven, Connecticut